Rigaku Corporation is an international manufacturer and distributor of scientific, analytical and industrial instrumentation specializing in X-ray related technologies, including X-ray crystallography, X-ray diffraction (XRD), X-ray reflectivity, X-ray fluorescence (XRF), automation, cryogenics and X-ray optics.

Locations
Rigaku is headquartered in Tokyo, Japan, with additional production, research and laboratory facilities located in both Japan and the United States. Subsidiaries in North America include Rigaku Americas Corporation (The Woodlands, Texas, United States), Applied Rigaku Technologies (Austin, Texas, USA) and Rigaku Innovative Technologies (Auburn Hills, Michigan, United States). European branches are located in Neu-Isenburg near Frankfurt, Germany, Prague, Czech Republic and Poland [Wrocław].

Products 
Rigaku manufactures and supplies high precision scientific instrumentation to academia, industry and trade. These include X-ray diffractometers, single crystal diffractometers,  X-ray Imagers, X-ray fluorescence spectrometers (both Energy Dispersive and Wavelength Dispersive varieties), thermal analysis equipment, Handheld Raman and LIBS analyzers and X-ray and EUV optics, X-ray sources and X-ray detectors.

In 2021 a successful collaboration with instrument manufacturer JEOL, saw the launch of a instrument dedicated to electron crystallography.  The XtaLAB Synergy-ED is the result of an innovative collaboration to combine Rigaku's core technologies: a high-speed, high-sensitivity photon-counting detector (HyPix-ED) and state-of-the-art instrument control and single crystal analysis software platform (CrysAlisPro for ED), and JEOL’s long-term expertise and market leadership in designing and producing transmission electron microscopes. The key feature of this product is that it provides researchers an integrated platform enabling easy access to electron crystallography. Due to the seamless interface using the software package called CrysAlisPro, well known in the field of X-ray Crystallography, the XtaLAB Synergy-ED is a system any X-ray crystallographer will find intuitive to operate without having to become an expert in electron microscopy.

History

1951 Rigaku was founded by Dr. Yoshihiro Shimura.

1952 The core innovation of the company was the introduction of the world's first commercially available rotating anode X-ray generator.

1954 Rigaku introduced the first automatic-recording X-ray diffractometer.

1976 Rigaku developed the first parallel-beam type X-ray diffractometer for stress analysis, as well as the first X-ray fluorescence spectrometers capable of carbon analysis (1976) and boron analysis (1981).

2021 Rigaku announced that that global investment firm The Carlyle Group (NASDAQ: CG) and Mr. Hikaru Shimura, President and CEO of Rigaku has agreed to jointly acquire all outstanding shares of Rigaku, through a holding company to be newly set up by Carlyle and Mr. Shimura. Carlyle is expected to own approximately 80%, and Mr. Shimura approximately 20% of the new entity. 

Today, the company is led by Mr. Toshiyuki Ikeda (President & CEO).

References

External links
 Rigaku home page (English)
 Rigaku home page (Japanese)
 Rigaku Journal: An International Journal of X-ray Characterization

1951 establishments in Japan
Manufacturing companies established in 1951
X-ray equipment manufacturers